Waterwood is the name used by the locals of Fayette County, Georgia, to describe a swamp approximately  in area. It is located .47 miles northeast of Inman Road Beach City, Georgia

Wildlife 
Waterwood is home to a stunning variety of flora and fauna. The following animals have been observed in the area: white-tailed deer, split-fin minnow, honeybee, great horned owl, bluejay, black rat snake, water moccasin, copperhead snake. Waterwood is also home to many species of semi-aquatic shrubs, including blue-lance and river crowns. The area is full of trees drowned during the swamp's forming. The trees have fallen to form bridges traversing the entire area. The trees decaying in the swamp's water results in the water taking in on a color similar to dark tea. The water is also rich in nutrients, allowing it to support a large population of microscopic life forms.

References
Karlyle, James. "Fayette County Oposunt 2002".
Copyright 2002. Routon Publishing, Beaufort, Sc.

Landforms of Fayette County, Georgia
Swamps of Georgia (U.S. state)